In mathematics, ergodic flows occur in geometry, through the geodesic and horocycle flows of closed hyperbolic surfaces. Both of these examples have been understood in terms of the theory of unitary representations of locally compact groups: if Γ is the fundamental group of a closed surface, regarded as a discrete subgroup of the Möbius group G = PSL(2,R), then the geodesic and horocycle flow can be identified with the natural actions of the subgroups A of real positive diagonal matrices and N of lower unitriangular matrices on the unit tangent bundle G / Γ. The Ambrose-Kakutani theorem expresses every ergodic flow as the flow built from an invertible ergodic transformation on a measure space using a ceiling function. In the case of geodesic flow, the ergodic transformation can be understood in terms of symbolic dynamics; and in terms of the ergodic actions of Γ on the boundary S1 = G / AN and G / A = S1 × S1 \ diag S1. Ergodic flows also arise naturally as invariants in the classification of von Neumann algebras: the flow of weights for a factor of type III0 is an ergodic flow on a measure space.

Hedlund's theorem: ergodicity of geodesic and horocycle flows 
The method using representation theory relies on the following two results:

A continuous function on  that is constant on -orbits must therefore be constant on the real axis with the origin removed. By unitarity, |||| =  = , so that  =  for all  in  =  = . Now let  be the matrix .

For the unitary 1-parameter group  ≅ , let  be the spectral subspace corresponding to the interval . Then . Since  = , it follows  =  in either case.

The classical theorems of Gustav Hedlund from the early 1930s assert the ergodicity of the geodesic and horocycle flows corresponding to compact Riemann surfaces of constant negative curvature. Let  be a cocompact subgroup of  = } for which all non-scalar elements are hyperbolic. Let  =  where  is the subgroup of rotations . This action if ergodic if 
Since  is compact, this will be the case if = . Let  = . Since  is right-invariant under , it follows that  is constant, as required. Hence the geodesic flow is ergodic.

Ambrose−Kakutani–Krengel–Kubo theorem

Induced flows  
Let T be a non-singular invertible transformation of (X,μ) giving rise to an automorphism τ of A = L∞(X). This gives rise to an invertible transformation T ⊗ id of the measure space (X × R,μ × m), where m is Lebesgue measure, and hence an automorphism τ ⊗ id of A  L∞(R). Translation Lt defines a flow on R preserving m and hence a flow λt on L∞(R). Let S = L1 with corresponding automorphism σ of L∞(R). Thus τ ⊗ σ gives an automorphism of A  L∞(R) which commutes with the flow id ⊗ λt. The induced measure space Y is defined by B = L∞(Y) =  L∞(X × R)τ ⊗ σ, the functions fixed by the automorphism τ ⊗ σ. It admits the induced flow given by the restriction of id ⊗ λt to B. Since λt acts ergodically on L∞(R), it follows that the functions fixed by the flow can be identified with L∞(X)τ. In particular if the original transformation is ergodic, the flow that it induces is also ergodic.

Flows built under a ceiling function 
The induced action can also be described in terms of unitary operators and it is this approach which clarifies the generalisation to special flows, i.e. flows built under ceiling functions. Let R be the Fourier transform on L2(R,m), a unitary operator such that Rλ(t)R∗ = Vt where λ(t) is translation by t and Vt is multiplication by eitx. Thus Vt lies in L∞(R). In particular V1 = R S R∗. A ceiling function h is a function in A with h ≥ ε1 with ε > 0. Then eihx gives a unitary representation of R in A, continuous in the strong operator topology and hence a unitary element W of A  L∞(R), acting on L2(X,μ) ⊗ L2(R). In particular W commutes with I ⊗Vt. So  commutes with I ⊗ λ(t). The action T on L∞(X) induces a unitary U on L2(X) using the square root of the Radon−Nikodym derivative of μ ∘ T with respect to μ.

The induced flow corresponds to the ceiling function h ≡ 1, the constant function. Again  W1, and hence  commutes with I ⊗ λ(t). The same reasoning as for induced actions shows that the functions fixed by the flow correspond to the functions in A fixed by σ, so that the special flow is ergodic if the original non-singular transformation T is ergodic.

Relation to Hopf decomposition 

If St is an ergodic flow on the measure space (X,μ) corresponding to a 1-parameter group of automorphisms σt of A = L∞(X,μ), then by the Hopf decomposition either every  St with t ≠ 0 is dissipative or every St with t ≠ 0 is conservative. In the dissipative case, the ergodic flow must be transitive, so that A can be identified with L∞(R) under Lebesgue measure and R acting by translation.

To prove the result on the dissipative case, note that A = L∞(X,μ) is a maximal Abelian von Neumann algebra acting on the Hilbert space L2(X,μ). The probability measure μ can be replaced by an equivalent invariant measure λ and there is a projection p in A such that σt(p) < p for t > 0 and λ(p – σt(p)) = t. In this case σt(p) =E([t,∞)) where E is a projection-valued measure on R. These projections generate a von Neumann subalgebra B of A. By ergodicity σt(p)  1 as t tends to −∞. The Hilbert space L2(X,λ) can be identified with the completion of the subspace of f in A with λ(|f|2) < ∞. The subspace corresponding to B can be identified with L2(R) and B with L∞(R). Since λ is invariant under St, it is implemented by a unitary representation Ut. By the Stone–von Neumann theorem for the covariant system B, Ut, the Hilbert space H = L2(X,λ) admits a decomposition L2(R) ⊗  where B and Ut act only on the first tensor factor. If there is an element a of A not in B, then it lies in the commutant of B ⊗ C, i.e. in B  B(). If can thus be realised as a matrix with entries in B. Multiplying by χ[r,s] in B, the entries of a can be taken to be in L∞(R) ∩ L1(R). For such functions f, as an elementary case of the ergodic theorem the average of σt(f) over [−R,R] tends in the weak operator topology to ∫ f(t) dt. Hence for appropriate χ[r,s] this will produce an element in A which lies in C ⊗ B() and is not a multiple of 1 ⊗ I. But such an element commutes with Ut so is fixed by σt, contradicting ergodicity. Hence A = B = L∞(R).

When all the σt with t ≠ 0 are conservative, the flow is said to be properly ergodic. In this case it follows that for every non-zero p in A and t ≠ 0, p ≤ σt (p) ∨ σ2t (p) ∨ σ3t (p) ∨ ⋅⋅⋅ In particular ∨±t>0 σt (p) = 1 for p ≠ 0.

Theorem of Ambrose–Kakutani–Krengel–Kubo  

The theorem states that every ergodic flow is isomorphic to a special flow corresponding to a ceiling function with ergodic base transformation. If the flow leaves a probability measure invariant, the same is true of the base transformation.

Let  =  and let  be the ergodic flow. Since the flow is conservative, for any projection p ≠ 0, 1 in A there is a T > 0 without σT(p) ≤ p, so that . On the other hand, as r > 0 decreases to zero

in the strong operator topology or equivalently the weak operator topology (these topologies coincide on unitaries, hence involutions, hence projections). Indeed, it suffices to show that if ν is any finite measure on A, then ν(ar) tends to ν(p). This follows because f(t) = ν(σt(p)) is a continuous function of t so that the average of f over [0,r] tends to f(0) as r tends to 0.

Note that . Now for fixed r > 0, following , set

Set r = N–1 for N large and fN = ar. Thus 0 ≤ fN ≤ 1 in L∞(X,μ) and fN tends to a characteristic function p in L1(X,μ). But then, if ε = 1/4, it follows that χ[0,ε](fN) tends to χ[0,ε](p) = 1 – p in L1(X). Using the splitting A = pA ⊕ (1 − p)A, this reduces to proving that if 0 ≤ hN ≤ 1 in L∞(Y,ν) and hN tends to 0 in L1(Y,ν), then χ[1−ε,1](hN) tends to 0 in L1(Y,ν). But this follows easily by Chebyshev's inequality: indeed , so that , which tends to 0 by assumption.

Thus by definition q0(r) ∧ q1(r) = 0. Moreover, for r = N−1 sufficiently small, q0(r) ∧ σT(q1(r)) > 0. The above reasoning shows that q0(r) and  q1(r) tend to 1 − p and p as r = N−1 tends to 0. This implies that q0(r)σT(q1(r)) tends to (1 − p)σT(p) ≠ 0, so is non-zero for N sufficiently large. Fixing one such N and, with r = N−1, setting q0= q0(r) and q1= q1(r), it can therefore be assumed that

The definition of q0 and  q1 also implies that if δ < r/4 = (4N)−1, then

In fact if s < t

Take s = 0, so that t > 0 and suppose that e = σt(q0) ∧ q1 > 0.  So e = σt(f) with f ≤ q0. Then σt(ar)e =  σt(arf) ≤ 1/4 e and are ≥ 3/4 e, so that

Hence ||ar − σt(ar)||∞ ≥ 1/2. On the other hand  ||ar − σt(ar)||∞ is bounded above by 2t/r, so that t ≥ r/4. Hence σt(q0) ∧ q1 = 0 if |t| ≤ δ.

The elements ar depend continuously in operator norm on r on (0,1]; from the above  σt(ar) is norm continuous in t. Let B0 the closure in the operator norm of the unital *-algebra generated by the σt(ar)'s. It is commutative and separable so, by the Gelfand–Naimark theorem, can be identified with C(Z) where Z is its spectrum, a compact metric space. By definition B0 is a subalgebra of A and its closure B in the weak or strong operator topology can be identified with L∞(Z,μ) where μ is also used for the restriction of μ to B. The subalgebra B is invariant under the flow σt, which is therefore ergodic. The analysis of this action on B0 and B yields all the tools necessary for constructing the ergodic transformation T and ceiling function h. This will first be carried out for B (so that A will temporarily be assumed to coincide with B) and then later extended to A.

The projections q0 and q1 correspond to characteristic functions of open sets. X0 and X1 The assumption of proper ergodicity implies that the union of either of these open sets under translates by σt as t runs over the positive or negative reals is conull (i.e. the complement has measure zero). Replacing X by their intersection, an open set, it can be assumed that these unions exhaust the whole space (which will now be locally compact instead of compact). Since the flow is recurrent any orbit of σt passes through both sets infinitely many times as t tends to either +∞ or −∞. Between a spell first in X0 and then in X1 f must assume the value 1/2 and then 3/4. The last time f equals 1/2 to the first time it equals 3/4 must involve a change in t of at least δ/4 by the Lipschitz continuity condition. Hence each orbit must intersect the set Ω of x for which  f(x) = 1/2, f(σt(x)) > 1/2 for 0 < t ≤ δ/4 infinitely often. The definition implies that different insections with an orbit are separated by a distance of at least δ/4, so Ω intersects each orbit only countably many times and the intersections occur at indefinitely large negative and positive times. Thus each orbit is broken up into countably many half-open intervals [rn(x),rn+1(x)) of length at least δ/4 with rn(x) tending to ±∞ as n tends to ±∞. This partitioning can be normalised so that r0(x) ≤ 0 and r1(x) > 0. In particular if x lies in Ω, then t0 = 0. The function rn(x) is called the nth return time to Ω.

The cross-section Ω is a Borel set because on each compact set {σt(x)} with t in [N−1,δ/4] with N > 4/δ, the function g(t) = f(σt(x)) has an infimum greater than 1/2 + M−1 for a sufficiently large integer M. Hence Ω can be written as a countable intersection of sets, each of which is a countable unions of closed sets; so Ω is therefore a Borel set. This implies in particular that the functions rn are Borel functions on X. Given y in Ω, the invertible Borel transformation T is defined on Ω by S(y) = σt(y) where t = r1(y), the first return time to Ω. The functions rn(y) restrict to Borel functions on Ω and satisfy the cocycle relation:

where τ is the automorphism induced by T. The hitting number Nt(x) for the flow St on X is defined as the integer N such that t lies in [rN(x),rN+1(x)). It is an integer-valued Borel function on R × X satisfying the cocycle identity

The function h = r1 is a strictly positive Borel function on Ω so formally the flow can be reconstructed from the transformation T using h a ceiling function. The missing T-invariant measure class on Ω will be recovered using the second cocycle Nt. Indeed, the discrete measure on Z defines a measure class on the product Z × X and the flow St on the second factor extends to a flow on the product given by

Likewise the base transformation T induces a transformation R on R × Ω defined by

These transformations are related by an invertible Borel isomorphism Φ from R ×  Ω  onto Z × X defined by

Its inverse Ψ from Z × X onto R ×  Ω is defined by

Under these maps the flow Rt is carried onto translation by t on the first factor of R ×  Ω  and, in the other direction, the  invertible R is carried onto translation by -1 on Z × X. It suffices to check that the measure class on Z × X carries over onto the same measure class as some produce measure m × ν on R × Ω, where m is Lebesgue measure and ν is a probability measure on Ω with measure class invariant under T. The measure class on Z × X is invariant under R, so defines a measure class on R × Ω, invariant under translation on the first factor. On the other hand, the only measure class on R invariant under translation is Lebesgue measure, so the measure class on R × Ω is equivalent to that of m × ν for some probability measure on  Ω. By construction ν is quasi-invariant under T. Unravelling this construction, it follows that the original flow is isomorphic to the flow built under the ceiling function h for the base transformation T on (Ω,ν).

The above reasoning was made with the assumption that B = A. In general A is replaced  by a norm closed separable unital *-subalgebra A0
containing B0, invariant under σt and such that σt(f) is a norm continuous function of t for any  f in 
A0. To construct A0, first take a generating set for the von Neumann algebra A formed of countably many projections invariant under σt with t rational. Replace each of this countable set of projections by averages over intervals [0,N−1] with respect to 
σt. The norm closed unital *-algebra that these generate yields A0. By definition it contains B0 = C(Y). By the Gelfand-Naimark theorem A0 has the form C(X). The construction with ar above applies equally well here: indeed since B0 is a subalgebra of A0, Y is a continuous quotient of X, so a function such as ar is equally well a function on X. The construction therefore carries over mutatis mutandis to A, through the quotient map.

In summary there exists a measure space (Y,λ) and an ergodic action of Z × R on M = L∞(Y,λ) given by commuting actions τn and σt such that there is a τ-invariant subalgebra of M isomorphic to (Z) and a σ-invariant subalgebra of M isomorphic to L∞(R). The original ergodic flow is given by the restriction of σ to Mτ and the corresponding base transformation given by the restriction of τ to Mσ.

Given a flow, it is possible to describe how two different single base transformations that can be used to construct the flow are related. be transformed back into an action of Z on Y, i.e. into an invertible transformation TY on Y. Set-theoretically TY (x) is defined to be Tm(x) where m ≥ 1 is the smallest integer such that Tm(x) lies in X. It is straightforward to see that applying the same process to the inverse of T yields the inverse of TY.  The construction can be described measure theoretically as follows. Let e = χY in B = L∞(X,ν) with ν(e) ≠ 0. Then e is an orthogonal sum of projections en defined as follows:

Then if f lies in en B, the corresponding automorphism is τe(f) = τn(f).

With these definitions two ergodic transformations τ1, τ2 of B1 and B2 arise from the same flow provided there are non-zero projections e1 and e2 in B1 and B2 such that the systems (τ1)e1, e1B1 and (τ2)e2, e2B2 are isomorphic.

See also
 Anosov flow
 Axiom A

Notes

References

 

 
 

 
 
 
 

 

Ergodic theory